Farn-Sasan was the last king of the Indo-Parthian Kingdom, ruling the region of Sakastan approximately from 210 to 226. Literary sources makes no mention of him, and he is only known through the coins he issued. He was defeated in 226 by the Sasanian ruler Ardashir I, which marked the end of Indo-Parthian rule.

Etymology 
The main part of the name "Sasan" was popular in the Indo-Parthian realm. The etymology of the name is uncertain; according to scholars David Neil MacKenzie and V.A. Livshits the name is derived from Old Iranian *Sāsāna ("defeating enemy"). It was the name of a local Zoroastrian deity venerated in Indo-Parthia and Khwarazm.

Biography 
Farn-Sasan gained control of the Indo-Parthian throne sometime in 210. The identity of his predecessor is unknown; it may have been Pacores. Farn-Sasan is not mentioned in any literary sources, and is only solely known through his coins, which have the inscription; "Farn-Sasan, son of Adur-Sasan, grandson of Tirdat, son of the grandson of Sanabares, the King of Kings." With this inscription, Farn-Sasan tried to legitimize his rule by linking himself with his great-grandfather Sanabares, who was the last prominent Indo-Parthian king. Although the title of King of Kings is put after the name of Sanabares, Farn-Sasan in reality refers himself as King of Kings, which was the traditional titulature of the Achaemenid and Parthian rulers.

Neither Adur-Sasan nor Tirdat is known to have ruled, which implies that Farn-Sasan was seemingly from a cadet branch of the dynasty. On the obverse of his coins, he is portrayed with a cap. On the reverse, a fire altar is depicted, with an inscription circled around it. Farn-Sasan is the only king known to show a fire altar on coins originating from Sakastan. Around the same time, another king issued coins with a similar fire-altar depicted on it, which was the Sasanian ruler Ardashir I, who around the same time was extending his domains into the east. It is uncertain if Farn-Sasan copied the iconography of Ardashir I's reverse coins, or vice versa. The resemblance of the coinage of Farn-Sasan and the Sasanian Ardashir I, including the shared name Sasan—a name popular in the Indo-Parthian realm—suggests that the Sasanians and Indo-Parthians possibly shared a common ancestry. Modern historians regard them as rivals and claimants to the title of King of Kings. The Iranologist Khodadad Rezakhani argues that Farn-Sasan was a superior of Ardashir I, and that the latter was only able to declare himself Kings of Kings after he defeated Farn-Sasan in 226, which marked the end of Indo-Parthian rule.

Notes

References

Sources 
 
 Kalani, Reza. 2017. Multiple Identification Alternatives for Two Sassanid Equestrians on Fīrūzābād I Relief: A Heraldic Approach. Tarikh Negar Monthly.
 
 

Indo-Parthian kings
3rd-century monarchs in Asia
3rd-century Iranian people
226 deaths
Year of birth unknown